Ovapa is an unincorporated community in Clay County, West Virginia, United States.

The community's name most likely is a portmanteau of Ohio, Virginia and Pennsylvania.

References

Unincorporated communities in Clay County, West Virginia
Unincorporated communities in West Virginia